Hugo Ariel Viegas Barriga (born 25 June 1989) is an Argentine professional footballer who plays as a midfielder.

Career
Viegas began his youth career with All Boys, prior to joining the San Lorenzo academy. He played the 2009–10 campaign with Brujas in Costa Rica's Primera División, making six appearances which included his professional debut versus Cartaginés on 16 August 2009. Four years later, Viegas returned to his homeland with UAI Urquiza of Primera B Metropolitana. He scored on his sixth appearance against Acassuso, with another goal coming in a 1–0 win over Comunicaciones. He notched versus the same opponents in the following 2015 campaign, alongside a strike in a game with Atlanta, as he featured seventy-nine times for them.

Viegas spent the 2017–18 season with fellow tier three team Barracas Central. On 5 June 2018, Viegas completed a move to Acassuso. His first appearances arrived in the succeeding August in matches with Colegiales, Comunicaciones and Talleres. In 2019, Viegas moved to National Premier Soccer League side El Farolito in the United States. He netted his first goal on 15 June against East Bay FC Stompers.

Career statistics
.

References

External links

1989 births
Living people
Place of birth missing (living people)
Argentine footballers
Association football midfielders
Argentine expatriate footballers
Expatriate footballers in Costa Rica
Expatriate soccer players in the United States
Argentine expatriate sportspeople in Costa Rica
Argentine expatriate sportspeople in the United States
Liga FPD players
Primera B Metropolitana players
National Premier Soccer League players
Brujas FC players
UAI Urquiza players
Barracas Central players
Club Atlético Acassuso footballers
El Farolito Soccer Club players